Aro Kangan is a settlement in the remote mountainous interior of Sarawak, Malaysia.

To reach Aro Kangan from the coastal city of Miri the journey involves a one-hour flight to Long Lellang Airport, followed by a four-hour walk through the jungle from Long Lellang to Aro Kangan.

Neighbouring settlements include:

References

Populated places in Sarawak